Clark Fork or Clarks Fork may refer to several places:

Populated places
Clark Fork, Idaho
Clarks Fork, Missouri
 Clark Fork Township, Cooper County, Missouri

Streams
Clark Fork (Petite Saline Creek), a stream in Missouri
Clark Fork (river), a river in Idaho and Montana
The Clarks Fork Yellowstone River in Montana and Wyoming